In the mathematical field of algebraic geometry, the relative canonical model of a singular variety of a mathematical object where 

Description

The precise definition is: 

If  is a resolution define the adjunction sequence to be the sequence of subsheaves  if  is invertible  where  is the higher adjunction ideal. Problem. Is  finitely generated?

Some basic properties were as follows:
The relative canonical model was independent of the choice of resolution. 
Some  integer multiple  of the canonical divisor of the relative canonical model was Cartier and the number of exceptional components where this agrees with the same multiple of the canonical divisor of Y is also independent of the choice of Y. When it equals the number of components of Y it was called crepant. It was not known whether relative canonical models were Cohen–Macaulay.

The class of varieties that are relative canonical models have canonical singularities. Since that time in the 1970s other mathematicians solved affirmatively the problem of whether they are Cohen–Macaulay. The minimal model program started by Shigefumi Mori proved that the sheaf in the definition always is finitely generated and therefore that relative canonical models always exist.

References

Algebraic geometry
Birational geometry
Complex manifolds
Dimension